Douglas Alan Stegmeyer (December 23, 1951 – August 25, 1995) was an American musician who was best known as the bassist and back-up vocalist for Billy Joel. Stegmeyer also performed as bassist for Debbie Gibson and Hall & Oates.

Biography
Stegmeyer was born on December 23, 1951, in Flushing, Queens, New York City, New York. In high school, he met Russell Javors, who at age 15 was performing songs with childhood friend Liberty DeVitto. Along with Howard Emerson, the boys formed the band Topper, which performed songs by Javors and attracted Billy Joel's attention. Joel hired Stegmeyer to play bass in his backing band on the Streetlife Serenade tour. At Stegmeyer's recommendation a year and a half later, Emerson, Javors, and DeVitto joined Joel in the studio for his Turnstiles album and for the accompanying tour.  Stegmeyer became a core member of Billy Joel's band, playing bass on Joel's studio albums from Turnstiles through The Bridge and on the live albums Songs in the Attic and КОНЦЕРТ. Stegmeyer was dubbed "The Sergeant Of The Billy Joel Band."

Stegmeyer (and Javors) left the band in 1989; according to DeVitto, he was forced out. Stegmeyer subsequently maintained a busy schedule recording and producing.

On August 25, 1995, Stegmeyer died from a self-inflicted gunshot wound in his Smithtown, New York, home.

Legacy
On October 23, 2014, Stegmeyer was inducted, posthumously, into the Long Island Music Hall of Fame, along with his Topper and Joel bandmates Richie Cannata, DeVitto, and Javors. The four were inducted primarily for their work with Joel.

See also
Billy Joel Band

Credits
With Billy Joel
1976 Turnstiles
1977 The Stranger
1978 52nd Street
1980 Glass Houses
1982 The Nylon Curtain
1983 An Innocent Man
1986 The Bridge

With Phoebe Snow
1978 Against the Grain
1981 Rock Away

With Melanie
1983 Seventh Wave

With Debbie Gibson
1990 Anything Is Possible

External links
 https://www.facebook.com/?ref=tn_tnmn#!/DougStegmeyer?fref=ts (Official Facebook Page dedicated to Doug Stegmeyer) 
 Memorial page for Stegmeyer

References

American session musicians
1951 births
1995 suicides
People from Long Island
American rock bass guitarists
American male bass guitarists
Record producers from New York (state)
People from Flushing, Queens
Suicides by firearm in New York (state)
20th-century American singers
American rock singers
Musicians from Queens, New York
Guitarists from New York City
American male guitarists
20th-century American bass guitarists
20th-century American male singers
Billy Joel Band members